Rostislav was a pre-dreadnought battleship built by the Nikolaev Admiralty Shipyard in the 1890s for the Black Sea Fleet of the Imperial Russian Navy. Rostislav became the world's first capital ship to burn fuel oil, rather than coal.

Her hull was launched in September 1896, but non-delivery of the ship's main guns delayed her maiden voyage until 1899 and her completion until 1900. In May 1899 Rostislav became the first ship of the Imperial Navy to be commanded by a member of the House of Romanov, Captain Alexander Mikhailovich. From 1903 to 1912 the ship was the flagship of the second-in-command of the Black Sea Fleet. During the 1905 Russian Revolution her crew was on the verge of mutiny, but ultimately remained loyal to the regime, and actively suppressed the mutiny of the cruiser Ochakov.

Rostislav was actively engaged in World War I until the collapse of the Black Sea Fleet in the beginning of 1918. She was the first Russian ship to fire on enemy targets on land during World War I, the first to be hit by a German airstrike, and the first to destroy a submarine, albeit a Russian one. In April 1918 the fleeing Bolsheviks abandoned Rostislav in Sevastopol. A year later the British occupation forces disabled her engines. The White forces used the ship as a towed floating battery, then scuttled her in the Kerch Strait in November 1920.

Design and description
Similar in size to earlier coastal defence ships but seaworthy for operations in the Black Sea, Rostislav was conceived in 1892 as a cheap and compact platform for 12-inch guns. Chief designer of the Nikolaev Shipyard, Sergey Ratnik, evaluated Chikhachov's request for proposals, and advised against the idea in general. The Naval Technical Committee (NTC) concurred: any meaningful combination of firepower, armor, speed and stability required at least . The NTC declined to discuss tactical matters, leaving the choice of armament to Chikhachov.

Chikhachov instructed Andrey Toropov of the Nikolaev Shipyard to draft two proposals, one armed with 10-inch and the other with 12-inch guns. Toropov estimated that the ship should have displaced at least 8,880 tons. Chikhachov admitted the fact and presented the two options to the NTC. The admiral himself and the active fleet commanders voted for the 12-inch caliber, which had already become a worldwide battleship standard, but the NTC strongly advised against it. The Navy brass spent April and May 1893 in lengthy debates. They agreed to increase displacement to 8,880 tons and were leaning toward accepting 12-inch guns when General Admiral Grand Duke Alexey resolved the discussion in favor of the smaller caliber.

Rostislav had the same hull as Sissoi Veliky, protected with the newly developed Harvey armor. She was also the first Russian battleship to use electric power instead of older hydraulic systems to train her guns.

General characteristics

Propulsion
Eight cylindrical fire-tube boilers provided steam to the engines, each of which drove one propeller. Half of the boilers were coal-fired and the other half were oil-fired, making Rostislav the first capital ship in the world to use fuel oil. This was done in order to substitute cheap oil from Baku for expensive imported coal.

Armament
The main armament consisted of two pairs of  45-caliber Model 1891 guns mounted in French-style, center-pivot twin gun turrets fore and aft. Each turret had an arc of fire of 240°. These guns had a maximum elevation of +15° and could depress to −5°. At an elevation of +6° the guns had a range . All eight of the 45-caliber,  Canet Pattern 1891 guns were mounted in twin-gun turrets on the main deck. Each turret was positioned at a corner of the superstructure and had an arc of fire of 110°. They had a maximum range of  when fired at an elevation of +20°.

The anti-torpedo boat armament consisted of twelve  Hotchkiss guns. Eight of these were mounted in the superstructure and the locations of the remaining four are unclear. The ship also mounted sixteen  Hotchkiss guns, eight of which were carried in the fighting top. The locations of the other eight are unknown.

Rostislav carried six  torpedo tubes. The bow and stern tubes and the aft pair of broadside tubes were above water. The forward broadside tubes were underwater. The ship carried 50 mines to be used to protect her anchorage.

Protection
While the exact height of the belt above the designed waterline is unknown, much of it, if not all, would have been below the waterline as the ship's draft was over  deeper than designed. The belt terminated forward in a  transverse bulkhead and aft in a  bulkhead. The sides of the main gun turrets were 10 inches thick and they had  roofs. The sides of the 6-inch turrets were 6 inches thick as were the sides of the conning tower. The armor deck was flat and located at the upper edge of the main belt. Below the waterline, forward and aft of the armored citadel, were  decks.

Construction
Work on Rostislav commenced on January 30, 1894. The ship was officially christened May 20, 1894; in line with Russian tradition, the formal laying down ceremony was delayed until May 19, 1895. The contract for oil-firing boilers and engines was awarded to Baltic Works. The armor was rolled in the United States by Bethlehem Steel within the framework of an earlier contract for s. Bethlehem Steel faced the scrutiny of the Senate Committee on Naval Affairs for charging the Russians an unusually low "introductory" price of $250 to $300 per ton, compared to $600 to $660 paid by the United States Navy.  Senator Benjamin Tillman publicly accused Bethlehem and Carnegie of price fixing and robbing the American taxpayer.

Rostislavs hull was launched on September 2, 1896. Lack of proper cranes in Nikolaev made the installation of its engines exceedingly difficult, to the point that the navy even considered towing the hull to Sevastopol for completion. The Nikolaev engineers eventually resolved the problem and the ship was ready to sail in July 1897. Rostislav conducted her speed trials on October 21, 1898, still missing her main guns.

Non-delivery of the new 10-inch Model 1897 guns, made by the Obukhov Factory in Saint Petersburg for Rostislav, s and s, delayed the completion of the ship by two years. One of these guns, earmarked for Admiral Ushakov, exploded at the proving ground and the whole batch was subjected to exhaustive tests and, when possible, repairs. Guns Number 16 through Number 19 passed the tests and were delivered to Sevastopol in July and August 1899. Rostislav was able to sail to her first gunnery trial on April 12, 1900. On the second day of shooting practice the recoil mechanisms of her forward turret failed and more defects were discovered back at the base. Rostislav spent the rest of the spring having her gun mounts repaired, but the problem persisted and the Navy "solved" it by prohibiting them from being used. The gun mounts were rebuilt along the pattern of those used by the armored cruiser  in 1901 and 1902, and Rostislav successfully passed the gunnery tests in June 1902. The ship's electrical turret controls, with their 332 contact pairs, required tedious maintenance and proved too complex for most of the enlisted men.

Service
On May 1, 1899, Captain Grand Duke Alexander Mikhailovich assumed command of Rostislav, becoming the first Romanov since Peter I to command a combat ship. Another Romanov, Grand Duke Kirill, spent a few uneventful months on board Rostislav in 1900. Alexander's guests, parties and diplomatic visits to Istanbul regularly interfered with the crew's duties, but he personally managed the repairs and alterations of the ship's equipment. Shipyards and contractors treated Rostislav as a priority customer. Alexander, based on his experience with Sissoi Veliky, persuaded the NTC to reinforce Rostislavs rudder frame and supervised installation of a backup control post deep under the conning tower. In 1903 Alexander was promoted to rear admiral and returned to his ship as a squadron commander. Rostislav served as the junior flagship of the Black Sea Fleet until September 1912.

The 1900 season revealed grave problems with Rostislavs boilers. Black smoke from burning oil was more conspicuous than coal smoke. Uneven distribution of heat inside the boilers caused severe local overheating, buckling of fireboxes and sudden backdrafts. For three and a half months the boilers failed one by one, starting with small auxiliary power units and ending with the main boilers. Oil delivered by the Rothschild-controlled Russian Standard Oil was not at fault; similar problems were experienced by oil-fired ships of the Baltic Fleet.
Repairs and alterations of the power plant continued until 1904, when the continuing boiler failures compelled the Navy to dispense with oil fuel and convert Rostislav to coal in 1904 and 1905. Each round of repairs and alterations added more weight to the already overweight ship, and by 1907 the ship's belt armor was completely below the waterline.

The Tsentralka, the group plotting a mutiny of the Black Sea Fleet, decided on June 25, 1905, that the mutiny should start on Potemkin rather than Rostislav. On June 27, 1905, the day of the battleship Potemkin mutiny, Rostislav was sailing under the ensign of Vice Admiral Alexander Krieger. Nicholas II ordered Krieger and his superior, fleet commander Grigory Chukhnin, to destroy the rebels by force, but the admirals refrained from shooting. They let the rebels flee to Odessa and later to Romania. Krieger's own crew was on the verge of open mutiny. On July 2, 1905, a military council held on board Rostislav decided to moor the ships in Odessa, disconnect the engines from the propellers and let the enlisted men walk ashore at will. By the time of the Ochakov mutiny in November 1905, fleet morale had improved and Krieger did not hesitate to fire two 10-inch and fourteen 6-inch shells against the rebels.

Exercises and casualties
After the Battle of Tsushima the Imperial Navy concentrated on improving their gunnery skills and fire-control practices. The experiment proved that the older ballistic tables used by the Navy were inaccurate. Berkalov compiled the data from the 1908 exercise into the new tables adopted by the Navy. Another of Krylov's initiatives, rapid counter-flooding, was standardized in 1909.

Two plans for modernizing the ship were put forward before World War I. In 1907 the Naval General Staff proposed a major reconstruction aimed at reducing her draft and raising her armor belt higher out of the water. Her above-water torpedo tubes, torpedo nets, auxiliary boilers and 47-millimeter guns would have been removed, her superstructure cut down and her rigging reduced to a single pole mast. Her above-water torpedo tubes, however, were removed about this time. In 1912 the staff of the Black Sea Fleet proposed to replace all of her 47 mm guns with four  guns and to remove the auxiliary boilers and the submerged torpedo tubes to offset the additional weight. The Naval General Staff did not think that this was worth the cost and rejected the plan. Even though these plans did not come to fruition, other alterations were made to Rostislav before the war. A dozen of her 37 mm guns were removed in 1906, and she was fitted with  rangefinders, probably made by Barr and Stroud, in 1907 and 1908.

In 1909 and 1910, Rostislav and the rest of the Black Sea Fleet prepared for joint operations with submarines. She was scheduled for an installation of the first Russian underwater acoustic communication system, but the installation was interrupted and her hardware was installed on the battleship  (the former Potemkin) instead. During an anti-submarine exercise on the night of June 11, 1909, Rostislav accidentally rammed and sank the submarine Kambala. Twenty men of Kambala and two rescue divers died. The accident was blamed on reckless maneuvering by the submarine, and Rostislavs captain was cleared of any negligence or wrongdoing.

Diplomatic incidents
Before the outbreak of World War I Rostislav was involved in two minor international incidents. On August 11, 1911,  and Panteleimon, two of the Black Sea Fleet battleships paying a state visit to Romania, ran aground on a shoal just off the port of Constanța. Rostislavs officers had detected the hazard and steered her to safety, but did not alert the other ships. The international embarrassment that followed led to the resignation of fleet commander Admiral Ivan Bostrem. During the First Balkan War Rostislav sailed into the Sea of Marmara to protect the Russian Embassy in Istanbul from a mob. Rostislav accidentally fired a live shell into the Turkish defenses. No one was injured during the incident, and the captain defused the situation with a personal apology to the Ottoman government.

World War I

Rostislav spent the winter of 1913–14 refitting, and in April 1914 she returned to the active fleet with newly overhauled machinery, new rangefinders and new gun sights. The ship made  on her post-refit trials.

On November 4, 1914, the Black Sea Fleet sailed out on its first combat operation of the war: the bombardment of Zonguldak. The operation was conceived as a retaliation against the Turkish-German attack on Sevastopol. Rostislav, captained by Kazimierz Porębski, was the "designated gunboat" while other Russian battleships formed a defensive screen around her. On November 6 she fired 251 shells at the port of Zonguldak, reducing it to rubble. On November 18 the ship faced Goeben during the Battle of Cape Sarych, but the German ship broke contact before Rostislav, trailing behind the Russian formation, even spotted her. Rostislav had other encounters with Goeben in 1915 and 1916, but did not engage her directly. In 1915 the ship received four 75 mm anti-aircraft guns.

After the commissioning of the  dreadnoughts, the old battleships were split into independent combat groups. Rostislav became the flagship of the Batumi Group tasked with supporting the ground operations of the Caucasus Army. Their first joint action began February 5, 1916, near Arhavi. On the first day alone the ship fired 400 shells against the Turks. On March 4 Rostislav and the gunboats Kubanetz and Donetz supported the amphibious landing at Atina. Three days later she supported the landing of marines that ended in the capture of Rize. At the end of March Rostislav and Panteleimon forced the Turks to evacuate Trabzon.

In the summer of 1916 the Navy seriously considered an all-out amphibious assault on the Bosphorus. Fleet commander Andrei Eberhardt anticipated a high risk of naval mine and torpedo hits in the coastal waters and suggested equipping all pre-dreadnought battleships with anti-torpedo bulges.  had her bulges fitted in Nikolaev in July 1916, and Rostislav was next in line, but the work was cancelled in August, and she was transferred to the Romanian coast as flagship of the Constanța Group. Constanța temporarily became an important logistical hub for the Russian troops heading to the Romanian Front, and the base for minelayers, submarines and destroyers harassing the enemy in the Bosphorus area. The Germans responded with air raids; their first aerial success against a Russian naval target was scored against Rostislav. The bomb hit the edge of the aft 10-inch turret and injured sixteen sailors. The turret itself remained fully operational. The collapse of the Romanian Front in October 1916 forced the Navy to evacuate Constanța. Rostislav returned to Sevastopol for a much-needed overhaul.

Revolution

The February Revolution of 1917 did not demoralize the Black Sea Fleet as quickly as the Baltic Fleet. Captain Fyodor Stark, a former destroyer commander, maintained Rostislav in combat-ready condition until the end of the year. The battleship sailed out for her last voyage to Batumi in September and October. Stark managed to contain the radical politics, anti-German sentiment and Ukrainization of the crew, but nevertheless raised the flag of Ukraine on his return to Sevastopol on October 25. From this moment desertion and "volunteering" into the Red Guards intensified, and by December 21 the crew was reduced to 460 enlisted men and 28 officers. In January 1918 the fleet disintegrated completely: the officers fled from the enraged enlisted men, then the enlisted men abandoned the ships and fled from the advancing German Army. On April 29, 1918, the Bolsheviks managed to extricate two battleships and sixteen destroyers from Sevastopol to Novorossiysk, but Rostislav and the rest of the fleet remained in Sevastopol.

The German occupation of Crimea from May to November 1918 did not affect the abandoned ship. The Anglo-French forces that replaced the Germans stayed in Sevastopol until April 1919. Before leaving, the British wrecked Rostislavs engines on April 25 to prevent the ship from being any use to the advancing Soviets. The White forces of Baron Wrangel used the disabled ship as a floating battery in the Sea of Azov. The ship, manned by a ragtag volunteer crew, was stationed in the shallow waters of the Kerch Strait to harass the Reds in Taman and prevent a landing in the Crimea. After the defeat of Wrangel's land forces, the crew scuttled Rostislav in the Kerch Strait to prevent the Red forces from breaking through to the Black Sea.

When Rostislav sank in the shallows her superstructure remained above water. In 1930, the EPRON (a Soviet salvage unit) retrieved the ship's guns and partially dismantled the hull.

Notes

Footnotes

Bibliography

Further reading
 Shirokorad, A. B. (1997, in Russian). Korabelnaya artilleriya Rossiyskogo flota 1867–1922. (Корабельная артиллерия Российского флота. 1867–1922). Morskaya Kollekciya, No. 2 (14), 1997, pp. 1–42.

1896 ships
Battleships of the Imperial Russian Navy
World War I battleships of Russia
Shipwrecks in the Black Sea
Shipwrecks of Russia
Scuttled vessels
Maritime incidents in 1920
Potemkin mutiny